Dicolectes fortis is a species of leaf beetle of West Africa and the Democratic Republic of the Congo. It was first described from Ghana by Julius Weise in 1895.

References 

Eumolpinae
Beetles of the Democratic Republic of the Congo
Taxa named by Julius Weise
Beetles described in 1895
Insects of West Africa